The Bavarian Radio Symphony Orchestra (BRSO) is a German radio orchestra. Based in Munich, Germany, it is one of the city's four orchestras. The BRSO is one of two full-size symphony orchestras operated under the auspices of Bayerischer Rundfunk, or Bavarian Broadcasting (BR). Its primary concert venues are the Philharmonie of the Gasteig Cultural Centre and the Herkulessaal in the Munich Residenz.

History
The orchestra was founded in 1949, with members of an earlier radio orchestra in Munich as the core personnel. Eugen Jochum was the orchestra's first chief conductor, from 1949 until 1960. Subsequent chief conductors have included Rafael Kubelík, Sir Colin Davis and Lorin Maazel. The orchestra's most recent chief conductor was Mariss Jansons, from 2003 until his death in 2019. Jansons regularly campaigned for a new concert hall during his tenure.

In 2010, Sir Simon Rattle first guest-conducted the BRSO. In January 2021, the BRSO announced the appointment of Rattle as its next chief conductor, effective with the 2023–2024 season, with an initial contract of 5 years.

The orchestra participates in the "Musica Viva" concerts, founded by the composer Karl Amadeus Hartmann, to this day.

The orchestra has recorded for a number of commercial labels, including Deutsche Grammophon, RCA, and EMI.  The orchestra received the 2006 Grammy Award for Best Orchestral Performance for its recording of Shostakovich's 13th Symphony.  The orchestra has recently begun to produce recordings under its own BR-Klassik label.

Chief conductors
Eugen Jochum (1949–1960)
Rafael Kubelík (1961–1979)
Sir Colin Davis (1983–1992)
Lorin Maazel (1993–2002)
Mariss Jansons (2003–2019)
Sir Simon Rattle (designated, from 2023)

See also
 Radio orchestra

References

External links

 Official website of the Bavarian Radio Symphony Orchestra

APRA Award winners
Bayerischer Rundfunk
German symphony orchestras
Music in Munich
Musical groups established in 1949
Radio and television orchestras
1949 establishments in Germany